Higher Octave Music is a sub-label imprint of Narada Productions. Since 2013, it is part of Universal Music Group's Capitol Music Group, which is located in Los Angeles.

History
Higher Octave was acquired by Virgin Records on behalf of EMI in 1997. In 2004, Higher Octave's offices in Malibu, California, were closed and the label was folded into Narada Productions at a reduced level of staffing and activity while retaining its imprint as a sub-label of Narada.

Two years later, Higher Octave moved to New York along with Narada and all of its related sub-labels to become part of EMI's merging all of its adult-focused music into The Blue Note Label Group.

High Octave has had several sub-labels, such as OmTown and CyberOctave.

Roster
 3rd Force
 Acoustic Alchemy
 Adiemus
 Jon Anderson
 William Aura
 B-Tribe
 Buckethead
 Craig Chaquico
 Cusco
 Four80East
 Robin Frederick
 Himekami
 Brian Hughes
 Ottmar Liebert
 Jim McCarty
 Moroccan Spirit
 Mythos
 Les Nubians
 John O'Connor
 Opafire
 Thomas Otten
 Kate Price
 Sacred Spirit
 Bryan Savage
 Neal Schon
 Shahin and Sepehr
 The Soto Koto Band
 Chris Spheeris
 Claus Zundel

See also 
 List of record labels

External links
 Official website (archived)

References

1983 establishments in California
American record labels
Universal Music Group
Music of Wisconsin
Smooth jazz record labels
New-age music record labels
World music record labels
EMI
Latin American music record labels
Companies based in Los Angeles